Christian Pescatori is a professional racecar driver from Italy. He was born in Brescia, on 1 December 1971.

Pescatori started his career in single-seater racing, becoming Italian Formula 3 Champion in 1993, before moving up to Formula 3000.

He later moved on to sports car racing, where he had more success. Pescatori won the Sports Racing World Cup in 2000, and the FIA GT Championship's N-GT class in 2001, both for JMB Racing. In 2002, he became an Audi works driver, winning the 12 Hours of Sebring. In 2001 and 2002 he was also second overall in the 24 Hours of Le Mans. In 2005 he was GTS Champion in the Le Mans Endurance Series.

24 Hours of Le Mans results

External links
 
 

1971 births
Living people
Italian racing drivers
Italian Formula Three Championship drivers
International Formula 3000 drivers
British Formula 3000 Championship drivers
American Le Mans Series drivers
FIA GT Championship drivers
24 Hours of Le Mans drivers
European Le Mans Series drivers
24 Hours of Spa drivers
12 Hours of Sebring drivers

Aston Martin Racing drivers
Audi Sport drivers
Team Joest drivers
Durango drivers